Sabine Schut-Kery (born 10 September 1968) is a German-American dressage rider. She competed at the Pan-American Games in 2015 where she won team gold with the American team. In 2021 the US Equestrian Federation nominated Schut-Kery to represent the US at the 2020 Olympic Games in Tokyo, where she won a silver medal in the team competition.

Personal life
Schut-Kery was born in Krefeld, Germany. She trained for many years in Germany, but in 1998 she moved to Texas to become Head Trainer at Proud Meadows. In 2005 she moved to California to pursue her dressage career. She became US citizen in 2007.

References

Living people
1968 births
American female equestrians
American dressage riders
Equestrians at the 2015 Pan American Games
Equestrians at the 2020 Summer Olympics
Pan American Games gold medalists for the United States
Medalists at the 2015 Pan American Games
Pan American Games medalists in equestrian
Medalists at the 2020 Summer Olympics
Olympic silver medalists for the United States in equestrian
21st-century American women